The Adventure Company was a Canadian video game developer and a former publishing division of DreamCatcher Interactive. It was sold to THQ Nordic GmbH in 2011 following DreamCatcher's parent (JoWooD Entertainment) assets being sold after entering administration.

History
The Adventure Company was first launched in January 2002 as a division and brand of DreamCatcher Interactive to distribute their adventure games titles under. The first title released under the new brand was The Cameron Files: Secret at Loch Ness which was released at the end of January 2002. The Adventure Company has worked with many developers including: Kheops Studio, THQ, Microïds, and Cryo Interactive. In 2006, DreamCatcher Interactive became a wholly owned subsidiary of the Austrian video game publisher JoWooD Entertainment.

On August 16, 2011, Nordic Games announced that it had acquired JoWooD, its products and brands and some of the companies' subsidiaries. Following the acquisition it was announced that JoWood and the Adventure Company will become publishing labels for Nordic Games, a wholly owned subsidiary of Nordic Games Holding.

Published games 
''Note: This list is for titles which The Adventure Company published. Re-releases of DreamCatcher Interactive games nor Nordic Games titles under The Adventure Company are not included.

References

THQ Nordic
Video game development companies
Canadian companies established in 2002
Canadian companies disestablished in 2011
Video game companies established in 2002
Video game companies disestablished in 2011
Defunct video game companies of Canada
Defunct companies of Ontario
Companies based in Toronto
2002 establishments in Ontario
2011 disestablishments in Ontario